Terri Hollowell (born July 2, 1956 in Jeffersonville, Indiana),  is an American singer.  She had five nationally charted singles between 1978 and 1980, has toured internationally, and has appeared on numerous nationally televised programs.

Career 
Hollowell became interested in a full-time career in music during her high school days in her hometown of Jeffersonville, Indiana. She signed with Con Brio Records in May 1978 and in the following two years she had five nationally charted singles.  Her release of "May I" broke her into the national country Top 40 in mid 1979,. and  "It’s Too Soon To Say Goodbye" yielded her first ASCAP Award for chart longevity in October 1979.  She recorded a remake of "Strawberry Fields Forever" by The Beatles. This release hit the national Billboard charts seven days after its release and remained for eight weeks.  She performed on national television in three continents; namely, the United States, Australia, and the United Kingdom and her first album entitled Just You And Me was well received by critics in all three regions. The album had also been released in Canada and several Scandinavian countries.  She made five trips to England between 1978 and 1980 and appeared in the Wembley Festival (  |   ), toured with country singer Don Williams in a national sell-out tour, co-hosted four BBC TV Specials, headlined her own club tour, and appeared with such artists as Johnny Cash and Glen Campbell on the Portsmouth Festival in 1979.

In 1980, she retired to spend time with her family.

In 2007 GMV Nashville released several albums on Hollowell, including songs that never released.

Albums

Singles

References 

1956 births
Living people
American women country singers
American country singer-songwriters
Country musicians from Indiana
21st-century American women
Singer-songwriters from Indiana